U21 or U-21 may refer to:

 Beechcraft U-21 Ute, an aircraft used by the United States military
 German submarine U-21, one of several German submarines
 Universitas 21, an international network of research-intensive universities
 U21 Premier League, an under-21 Premier League scheme